Henry Burslem (April 1790 – 11 June 1866) was an English amateur cricketer.

Burslem was not attached to any particular club.  He made two known appearances in first-class matches from 1810 to 1813.

References

1790 births
1866 deaths
English cricketers
English cricketers of 1787 to 1825